Benjamin Hall (6 March 1879 – 1963) was an English football player, manager and trainer, who played as a centre half.

Hall's playing career saw him represent Grimsby Town, Derby County, Leicester Fosse, Hyde, Heywood United and South Shields before the First World War. After the war he worked as a trainer for Huddersfield Town before being appointed as Bristol Rovers' first Football League manager in 1920.

Three of his brothers, Harry, Ellis and Fretwell, also played in the Football League.

References

External links

1879 births
1963 deaths
Footballers from Sheffield
English footballers
Association football midfielders
Grimsby Town F.C. players
Derby County F.C. players
Leicester City F.C. players
Hyde United F.C. players
Heywood United F.C. players
South Shields F.C. (1889) players
English Football League players
English football managers
Bristol Rovers F.C. managers
English Football League managers
Huddersfield Town A.F.C. non-playing staff
People from Ecclesfield